The Pontunj, also called the Yankonyu, are a contemporary Indigenous Australian people of the eastern Cape York Peninsula in northern Queensland.

Country
The Pontunj overlap with the Kawadji, of which Yankonyu is considered by Norman Tindale to be an alternative name, though he treats the Pontunj as distinct from the Kawadji people of Night Island and the coastal stretch opposite. Their territory covered some 300 sq. miles, running from Cape Weymouth southwards to the coast just to the north of Night Island and to the Lockhart River and Lloyd Bay areas.

Alternative names
 Jangkonju
 Yankonya.

Notes and references

Explanatory notes

Notes

References

Aboriginal peoples of Queensland